Death of Karen Fischer and Christian Struwe is about two German journalists working for Deutsche Welle who were shot on 7 October 2006 in a tent they had pitched alongside a road near Baghlan in Afghanistan, while they were doing research for a freelance documentary. They were the first foreign journalists killed after the 2001 invasion in the War in Afghanistan

Personal 
Karen Fischer was from Stuttgart, Germany. She attended Northeastern University in the United States and earned her master's degree in Journalism in 2000. She and Struwe were a couple (Lebensgefährte), and they had met in Kabul in 2004. Fischer was buried in Leonberg, Baden-Württemberg, which is close to Stuttgart.

Career 
Both Karen Fischer and Christian Struwe worked for Deutsche Welle, which is a German news service. DW was moving its Afghan radio service from Germany to Afghanistan. Struwe, a radio engineer and journalist, worked for DW for five years. He had just completed launching an international news office at Afghanistan's Radio Television Afghanistan (RTA), where he had also trained Afghan journalists. Karen Fischer had been with DW for 3 years, completing her internship there from 2002 to 2003. She had reported on parliamentary elections in Afghanistan. Before that she had been a reporter for DW in the Middle East and Lebanon. Both of the reporters were considered experienced foreign journalists and had traveled to Afghanistan multiple times in the past for personal or business reasons.

Death 
Karen Fischer and Christian Struwe were on a private research trip in Afghanistan, on the way to the historic site of the Buddha statues of Bamiyan, where the Taliban blew up the cultural heritage site in March 2001.

The two journalists had pitched a tent off to the side of the road to sleep for the night. Around 1:30 a.m., from four to six armed men with AK-47 rifles approached their tent and shot them. Their rented car also was shot. Afterward, the attackers escaped on foot. There didn't seem to be any sign that they were robbed. The bodies were found by villagers, who had heard the gunshots, a few minutes later. Police arrested six men and interrogated them shortly afterward.

Investigation
After solving the case of another German national, known as Christine M., who had been kidnapped at a restaurant in Afghanistan, authorities there announced that one of the four detained suspects was a possible "mastermind" behind the murder of Karen Fischer and Christian Struwe. Christine M. was pregnant at the time and she was working for the Christian aid Ora International organization. The detained group was described by police as criminals and not part of the Taliban.

Context 
The area around Baghlan, where they were killed, was more secure than some of the country, but the area was not very well protected by the government. There were Germans in Afghanistan who questioned their decisions to backpack and tent instead of stay in a safe location and to not take a driver who knew the language and country along with their car. In addition, they may not have known enough about the customs in the rural area.

Impact 
The killings happened on the fifth anniversary of the U.S. troops invading Afghanistan. Fischer and Struwe were also the first foreign reporters killed in Afghanistan since late 2001. Eight journalists in all died in 2001. After the event, officials from Afghanistan condemned the attack and expressed concerns about the safety of journalists in Afghanistan.

Monika Harms, who is the Attorney General of Germany, opened a federal case and recalled the bodies for an autopsy in Germany. The bodies were from Baghlan to Kabul and handed over transferred to German authorities at the embassy there.

Reactions 
The Taliban denied any involvement.

Koïchiro Matsuura, director-general of UNESCO, released an official statement: "I condemn the murder of Karen Fischer and Christian Struwe. It is essential that journalists, whether Afghan or foreign, be able to carry out their professional activities safely. Their ability to exercise their basic human right of freedom of expression is essential to the establishment of democracy and rule of law in Afghanistan."

German Foreign Minister Frank-Walter Steinmeier also condemned the murders, "This heinous crime must be solved and the perpetrators brought before justice."

The two journalists happened to be killed on the same day as Russian journalist Anna Politkovskaya, which remains a high-profile international case of a journalist killed for her reporting.

See also
 List of journalists killed during the War in Afghanistan (2001–14)

References

External links
 Images of Karen Fischer at Pbase.com
 Image of their Memorial at the Newseum in Washington, D.C.

October 2006 events in Asia
Baghlan Province
War in Afghanistan (2001–2021) and the media